The New South Wales Crown Solicitor's Office (CSO) is an executive government agency of the New South Wales Department of Justice in Australia that has the role of providing legal services to the government, its agencies, and its statutory authorities. The Office practices in twelve areas of law, namely administrative law, child protection law, commercial law, community law, constitutional law, coronial law and inquiries, criminal law, employment law, government law, native title law, property law, and tort law. The Office frequently instructs barristers with regard to civil matters.

It was announced on 10 June 2015 that Lea Armstrong would be appointed as Crown Solicitor (to commence 13 July 2015); she became the first woman appointed to that role in New South Wales. Previously John McDonnell followed by Richard Kelly were the Acting Crown Solicitor following the departure of Ian Knight.

History
In 1817, the position of Solicitor for the Crown, or Crown Solicitor, of the colony of New South Wales was created with the appointment of Thomas Wylde. In 1839, a Crown Solicitor for civil matters and another for criminal matters were appointed; but, in 1856, with introduction of responsible government, these roles were merged into that of a single New South Wales Crown Solicitor. In 1902, the first Australian-born New South Wales Crown Solicitor, John Varnell Tillett, was appointed to the position.

During the 1990s, the operations of the Crown Solicitor's Office were commercialised, and the Office was required to compete with the private legal profession for untied government legal work. In 1994, Ian Victor Knight, was appointed to the position; and, in 1996, he commenced a restructuring of the agency, converting its four branches into ten specialist practice groups.

Functions
The Office provides legal services with regard to:
matters that have implications for the Government of New South Wales beyond an individual Minister's portfolio;
matters that involve the constitutional powers and privileges of the State of New South Wales and/or the Commonwealth of Australia;
matters that raise issues which are fundamental to the responsibilities of Government; and,
matters that arise from, or relate to, matters falling within the Attorney General's area of responsibility.

In addition to this, the Office competes with private legal firms and professionals to perform untied, general legal work for government agencies. Although it can act for individuals sued on behalf of the state, the Office cannot, however, provide legal services to the general public, which is the function of LawAccess NSW, per Section 110 of the Legal Profession Act 2004 (NSW).

List of Crown Solicitors

References

External links

Government agencies of New South Wales
New South Wales law